Gentiana loureiroi is a species of plant native to Asia. It is one of the 50 fundamental herbs used in traditional Chinese medicine, where it has the name dì dīng (Chinese: 地丁).

Traditional medicine

Gentiana loureiroi is one of the 50 fundamental herbs used in traditional Chinese medicine.

References

loureiroi